Knema furfuracea is a species of plant in the family Myristicaceae. It is a tree found in Peninsular Malaysia, Singapore and Thailand.

References

furfuracea
Trees of Malaya
Trees of Thailand
Least concern plants
Taxonomy articles created by Polbot